The Grand Mayfull Hotel Taipei is skyscraper hotel completed in 2015 in Zhongshan District, Taipei, Taiwan.

The Hotel
The hotel has a total of 146 rooms including 20 premium suites, 5 themed restaurants, one café and a bar. It also offers a grand ballroom with a 7-meter high ceiling and a heated outdoor swimming pool with sauna overlooking the Taipei 101. The hotel was classified as one of Taiwan's leading hotels by the World Travel Awards in 2017 and was dubbed by the Michelin Guide as one of the top three luxury hotels in Taipei in both 2018 and 2019.

Restaurants & Bars 
 Palette: Buffet offering cuisines from around the globe.
 CHIU YUET FONG: Cantonese restaurant featuring traditional Cantonese & Teochew cuisines, as well as Dim Sum.
 MIPON: Restaurant offering Taiwanese cuisine that has received commendations from the Michelin Guide in 2018 and 2019.
 HARUYAMA: Japanese restaurant
 GMT Italian Restaurant 
 Cocoon Poolside Bar: A poolside bar with a view of the Taipei skyline
 Moment café & bakery: Offers freshly baked breads and beverages

See also
 Mandarin Oriental, Taipei
 Regent Taipei

References

External links
Grand Mayfull Hotel Taipei Official Website 
Grand Mayfull Hotel Taipei - Tourism Bureau of the Ministry of Transport of the Republic of China 

2015 establishments in Taiwan
Skyscraper hotels in Taipei
Hotel buildings completed in 2015